The IPSC French Rifle Championship is an IPSC level 3 championship held once a year by the French Shooting Federation.

Champions 
The following is a list of current and previous champions.

Overall category

Senior category

See also 
IPSC French Handgun Championship
IPSC French Rifle  Championship

References 

Match Results  - 2016 IPSC French Shotgun Championship
Match Results - 2017 IPSC French Shotgun Championship

IPSC shooting competitions
National shooting championships
France sport-related lists
Shooting competitions in France